The 1992–93 Argentine Primera B Nacional was the seventh season of second division professional of football in Argentina. A total of 22 teams competed; the champion and runner-up were promoted to Primera División.

Banfield (champion of the competition) and Gimnasia y Tiro (winner of "Torneo Octogonal" after beating Central Córdoba de Rosario in a two-legged series) promoted to the higher division.

Club information

Standings
Banfield after a tiebreaker playoff was declared champion and was automatically promoted to Primera División, and the teams placed 2nd to 8th qualified for the Second Promotion Playoff.

Tiebreaker Playoff 
As Banfield and Colón finished the season tied in 56 points, it was necessary to play a tiebreaker to define which team would be crowned as champion and which team had to play the Second Promotion Playoff. The match was played on June 26 at Chateau Carreras Stadium in Córdoba.

Banfield goalkeeper Javier Puentedura became keyplayer of its team after stopping two penalty shots. Javier Sanguinetti scored the last penalty shot for Banfield while Roberto Mamani missed for Colón, allowing the Taladro to win the series and promote to the highest division of Argentine football.

Second Promotion Playoff
The Second Promotion Playoff or Torneo Reducido was played by the teams placed 2nd to 8th in the overall standings: Colón (2nd), Gimnasia y Tiro (3rd), Sportivo Italiano (4th), Central Córdoba (R) (5th), Arsenal (6th), Quilmes (7th) and Almirante Brown (8th), and the champion of Primera B Metropolitana: All Boys.  The winning team was promoted to Primera División.

Bracket

Note: The team in the first line plays at home the second leg.

Relegation

Note: Clubs with indirect affiliation with AFA are relegated to their respective league of his province according to the Argentine football league system, while clubs directly affiliated face relegation to Primera B Metropolitana. Clubs with direct affiliation are all from Greater Buenos Aires, with the exception of Newell's, Rosario Central, Central Córdoba and Argentino de Rosario, all from Rosario, and Unión and Colón from Santa Fe.

See also
1992–93 in Argentine football

References

Primera B Nacional seasons
Prim
1992 in South American football leagues
1993 in South American football leagues